State Road 166 (NM 166) is a  state highway in Socorro County, New Mexico, United States. NM 166's western terminus is at the end of route east-southeast of Datil, and the eastern terminus is at NM 52 east-southeast of Datil. It runs along a portion of a former alignment of U.S. Route 60 and serves the visitor center of the Very Large Array astronomical observatory.

Major intersections

See also

References

166
Transportation in Socorro County, New Mexico